Adrian Shaw (born 30 April 1966) is an English football coach and former player.

Playing career
Born in Murton, County Durham, Shaw played for Murton Juniors before joining Nottingham Forest as an apprentice. He signed a professional contract with the club in December 1983 and was loaned to Halifax Town in December 1984. He made 10 appearances before the loan expired in March 1985, signing for the club permanently later that month. Shaw was released by Halifax in May 1988 and after a few weeks with Bridlington Town in non-League football signed for Fourth Division York City in October on a trial basis. His debut came in a 1–1 draw at home to Doncaster Rovers on 25 October, making six appearances for the club before being released. He joined Chesterfield in December, where he made 50 league appearances and scored three goals before a serious groin injury forced his retirement from professional football. Shaw returned to non-League football to finish his playing career with Gainsborough Trinity.

Coaching career
After retiring as a player, Shaw organised a football in the community scheme in Lincolnshire. He moved into coaching at Lincoln City as football in the community officer, before returning to Chesterfield as a coach. He returned to another former club, York, as youth team coach, before being promoted to first team coach. Shaw was Terry Dolan's assistant manager at York, until the pair were sacked by the club on 31 May 2003. He had a spell as manager of the Saint Vincent and the Grenadines national side in 2004.

References

1966 births
Living people
People from Murton, County Durham
Footballers from County Durham
English footballers
Association football defenders
Nottingham Forest F.C. players
Halifax Town A.F.C. players
Bridlington Town A.F.C. players
York City F.C. players
Chesterfield F.C. players
Gainsborough Trinity F.C. players
English Football League players
English football managers
Expatriate football managers in Saint Vincent and the Grenadines
Saint Vincent and the Grenadines national football team managers
York City F.C. non-playing staff
Lincoln City F.C. non-playing staff
Chesterfield F.C. non-playing staff